The Stretford process was developed during the late 1950s to remove hydrogen sulfide (H2S) from town gas. It was the first liquid phase, oxidation process for converting H2S into sulfur to gain widespread commercial acceptance. Developed by Tom Nicklin of the North Western Gas Board (NWGB) and the Clayton Aniline Company, in Manchester, England, the name of the process was derived from the location of the NWGB's laboratories, in Stretford.

The process uses reduction-oxidation (redox) chemistry to oxidise the H2S into elemental sulfur, in an alkaline solution containing vanadium as an oxygen carrier.

The process earned the NWGB a Queen's Award to Industry in 1968. Although it was used in the gas industry for only a relatively short time, the process was licensed by the NWGB and used successfully in a variety of industries worldwide. At the height of its popularity during the 1970s there were more than a dozen companies offering the Stretford technology. By 1987 about 170 Stretford plants had been built worldwide, and more than 100 were still operating in 1992, capable of removing 400,000 tons of sulfur per year. The first US plant was commissioned in 1971 at Long Beach, California, to process the gas from offshore oil wells.

See also
Sour gas
Hydrodesulfurization

References

Notes

Citations

Bibliography

Fuel gas
Industrial gases